Broadway Rose may refer to:

 Broadway Rose (panhandler), panhandler in the Broadway theater district of New York City
 Broadway Rose (film), a 1922 silent film
 Broadway Rose Theatre Company, a musical theatre company based in Tigard, Oregon

See also
Broadway Danny Rose, a 1984 American black-and-white comedy film